Ironstone Bridge is a historic concrete arch bridge located at Douglass Township in Berks County, Pennsylvania. It is a single span , concrete barrel arch bridge, constructed in 1907. It crosses Ironstone Creek.

It was listed on the National Register of Historic Places in 1988.

References 

Road bridges on the National Register of Historic Places in Pennsylvania
Bridges completed in 1907
Bridges in Berks County, Pennsylvania
National Register of Historic Places in Berks County, Pennsylvania
Arch bridges in the United States
Concrete bridges in the United States